Hypena denticulata is a moth of the family Erebidae first described by Frederic Moore in 1882. It is found in Darjeeling, India.

Its wingspan is about 33 mm.

References

denticulata
Moths of Asia
Moths described in 1882